Luxbet was an online betting company based in the Northern Territory, Australia. Luxbet was licensed by the Northern Territory Racing Commission and provided racing, sports and novelty betting options which encompass horse racing, harness racing, greyhound racing and feature racing, as well as American football, Australian rules football, baseball, rugby league, soccer matches and tennis. Luxbet offers betting options through telephone, internet and mobile applications.

Luxbet was a subsidiary of Tabcorp Holdings Limited, a public company listed on the Australian Stock Exchange.  Luxbet was founded and officially launched by Tabcorp in September 2008 and commenced operations on 1 October 2008. Luxbet ceased operated on 22 December 2017, following the merger between Tabcorp and Tatts Group.

History
Luxbet was launched by Tabcorp Holdings Limited as a complement to the gambling services already offered by the Tabcorp Group. Luxbet was positioned to offer gambling products that Tabcorp had been precluded from offering including betting on non-sport related events such as elections and entertainment.

In 2013, revenue generated by Luxbet exceeded $39 million which was up more than 40% from the previous year.

Luxbet’s success directly contributes to the support given to the racing industry by the Tabcorp group. In addition to the payment of taxes, race fields fees and product fees, Tabcorp also pays a share of Luxbet’s profits to each of the NSW and Victorian racing industries.

In 2015 Luxbet launched Luxbet Europe offering gambling services to the European market.

Products and services

Betting accounts
Luxbet enables customers to set up betting accounts into which funds can be deposited and then used to make bets. Luxbet accepts a range of payment options including VISA and MasterCard credit cards, deposits via Moneybookers or POLi and direct deposits via direct bank transfers or BPay.

Luxbet account holders may place bets online, via telephone or via Luxbet’s mobile applications.

Mobile application store
Luxbet offers applications for the iPhone, the iPad and Android devices. These applications are available for download from the respective official websites or application stores.

The Deposit Funds function allows Luxbet account holders to top up their Luxbet accounts using their mobile phones, while the Open Account function enables new users to set up accounts on the go. The mobile applications also allow users to check which racing, sports and other events are available for betting on, as well as enabling account holders to keep track of results.

Betting products
Luxbet offers a wide range of racing products including Best of the Best (which offers the best price of three totes & the highest of the top official on-course bookmakers fluctuation) and LuxDiv (which offers the best price of three totes & the highest of the top official on-course bookmakers starting price). The Luxfixed product offers fixed odds for horse races, greyhound races and harness races right up to the jump. Luxbet also offers Exotics products for both Australian and international racing on thoroughbreds, greyhounds and harness.

Luxbet also offers betting for a wide range of racing and sports events including the Melbourne Cup, the Spring Racing Carnival, National Rugby League, Australian Football League, Champions League and English Premier League. Betting through Luxbet is also available for other sports such as cricket, basketball, golf, tennis and motorsports.

Luxbet also offers products categorised as weekly specials, which offer the chance to obtain bonus bets.

The particulars of Luxbet’s product offering may change from time to time. A current list of Luxbet’s offering is available at www.Luxbet.com.

Affiliate programme

Luxbet operates an affiliate programme which allows its affiliates to receive a commission for referring customers to Luxbet. Luxbet distributes marketing material to affiliates through the programme and offers commissions of up to 30% of the monthly net revenue it earns through referred customers.

ClubXtra

ClubXtra offers owners and trainers in the horse racing industry the chance to win an additional 12% bonus when they place winning bets on horses trained or owned by them.

Credit betting
Luxbet offers credit betting facilities to applicants that meet the relevant criteria.

References
 About Us Page on Luxbet
 Tabcorp ASX Listing
 Revenue Generated from Luxbet
 Media Release from Tabcorp highlighting Luxbet's Launch
 Luxbet Affiliate Programme

External links
 

Australian companies established in 2008
Gambling companies established in 2008
Online gambling companies of Australia
Companies based in Darwin, Northern Territory